The South Essex Regiment, later the Prince of Wales' Own Volunteers, is a fictional infantry line regiment in the British Army that was created by Bernard Cornwell in the Sharpe novel series.

Fictional history
The regiment first appears in the inaugural Sharpe novel, Sharpe's Eagle (1981), taking place in 1809, commanded by Colonel Sir Henry Simmerson, who has raised the regiment at his own expense.

According to historian Mark Adkin, at the end of 1809 there were 103 regiments of foot in the British Army (the most junior being the 103rd), and the South Essex's designation would have been the 102nd, but it never received an official numerical designation, possibly because it was originally composed largely of militia soldiers, because it was disgraced and re-designated a battalion of detachments shortly after its formation, or because it was disbanded only nine years after its formation (historically, the New South Wales Corps was designated the 102nd Regiment of Foot).

Sharpe and his small detachment of riflemen from the 95th Rifles are attached to the South Essex after being separated from the rest of their regiment during Sir John Moore's retreat the previous year and the regiment is withdrawn to England.  Sharpe quickly clashes with Simmerson over the latter's harsh treatment of his soldiers, and humiliates Simmerson by successfully teaching the battalion's Light Company to improve their musketry skills.

In what should be a straightforward mission to destroy a bridge at Valdelacasa, in French-occupied Spain, the South Essex is disgraced when Simmerson's bad judgment leads to a high number of casualties and the loss of their King's Colour, though Sharpe manages to recover the Regimental Colour.  Simmerson tries to blame the disaster on Sharpe, but General Wellesley rebukes him by designating the South Essex a battalion of detachments, and promoting Sharpe to the captaincy of the Light Company.  At the Battle of Talavera, Simmerson panics at the sight of the advancing French and orders the South Essex withdrawn from the line of battle, leading to Wellesley relieving him of command and replacing him with Sharpe's old friend, Lt. Col. William Lawford.  During the battle, Sharpe and Sgt. Harper capture a French Imperial Eagle as a trophy, restoring the Regiment's honor (historically, the first British capture of an Imperial Eagle occurred at the Battle of Barrosa, in 1811, chronicled in Sharpe's Fury).  This Eagle is later featured on the Regiment's flag and jacket badges.

The South Essex continues to serve throughout the Peninsular Campaign, with Sharpe in command of its Light Company, which incorporates his remaining Riflemen.  After Lawford is wounded during the storming of Ciudad Rodrigo in 1812, he is replaced by Col. Brian Windham, who is ambushed and killed by a treacherous French officer outside Salamanca.

In Sharpe's Regiment, the South Essex is in danger of being disbanded for lack of fresh recruits.  Sharpe and Harper return to England and discover that Simmerson is using the South Essex's Second (recruiting) battalion in a crimping scheme, using the First Battalion's lustrous reputation to attract new recruits, then selling them off to other regiments without replacing the First Battalion's losses.  Unable to take official action against Simmerson, Sharpe assumes command of the Second battalion and parades it in London, renaming it the Prince of Wales' Own Volunteers, playing on the military enthusiasm of the Prince Regent, who gleefully endorses Sharpe taking the battalion to Europe (in reality, the South Lancashire Regiment is known as the "Prince of Wales's Volunteers").  Sharpe installs the Second battalion's nominal commander, Colonel Bartholomew Girdwood, in overall command of the Regiment, while making it clear that the rank-and-file's loyalty is to Sharpe alone.  Girdwood suffers a nervous breakdown during the Battle of Nivelle, as the South Essex Regiment joins the British Army's invasion of French territory.  After the Battle of Toulouse and Napoleon's abdication, Sharpe leaves the Regiment and settles in Normandy with his French lover, Lucille Castineau.

The Prince of Wales' Own Volunteers is present at the Battle of Waterloo, under the command of Lt. Col. Joseph Ford.  At the Battle of Quatre Bras, the regiment was nearly decimated by French cavalry. During the climactic attack of the Imperial Guard, Ford suffers a breakdown, and Sharpe takes command to prevent the Regiment from breaking, addressing the soldiers by the Regiment's original name, the South Essex.  As the French army breaks, Lord Wellington confirms Sharpe in command of the regiment and orders it to join the general advance of the British line. After Waterloo, in Sharpe's Assassin, the Regiment is assigned to rescue British prisoners from the Château de Ham. Later in Paris, the regiment is sent with 3 Prussian companies to attacks a French battalion hiding in a vineyard. Soon after, Sharpe retires, and Major Peter D'Alembord takes command.

According to Adkin, the Regiment was disbanded in 1817, many of its remaining soldiers returning to civilian life, while others transferred into the 9th Regiment of Foot (the Royal Norfolk Regiment) or the 44th (East Essex) Regiment of Foot.  The latter was merged with the 56th to become the Essex Regiment under the Cardwell Reforms and there are several similarities between the (fictional) South Essex and (historical) East Essex regiments: both captured French Imperial Eagles, both have yellow coat facings, and they share a county designation.

Battle honours
According to Cornwell's novels, the South Essex/Prince of Wales' Own Volunteers has fought in the following engagements:
Battle of Talavera, 1809 (Sharpe's Eagle) (As part of the 2nd Infantry Division (United Kingdom))
Battle of Bussaco, 1810 (Sharpe's Escape)
Siege of Ciudad Rodrigo, 1812 (Sharpe's Company) (As part of the 3rd Infantry Division (United Kingdom))
Siege of Badajoz, 1812 (Sharpe's Company) (As part of the 4th Infantry Division (United Kingdom))
Battle of Salamanca, 1812 (Sharpe's Sword)
Battle of Vitoria, 1813 (Sharpe's Honour)
Battle of Nivelle, 1813 (Sharpe's Regiment)
Battle of Toulouse, 1814 (Sharpe's Revenge)
Battle of Waterloo, and Battle of Quatre Bras, 1815 (Sharpe's Waterloo) (As part of the 5th brigade, 3rd Infantry Division (United Kingdom), I Corps (United Kingdom))

Regimental Colonels
Sir Henry Simmerson (1809), relieved of command during the Battle of Talavera;
William Lawford (1809–1812), wounded and invalided home during the Siege of Ciudad Rodrigo;
Brian Windham (1812), transferred to the Colonelcy from Sir Thomas Picton's staff, ambushed and killed shortly before the Battle of Salamanca;
Thomas Leroy (1812–1813), expatriate American Loyalist, originally one of the regimental captains; killed at the Battle of Vitoria;
Bartholomew Girdwood (1813), originally the commander of the Second battalion, based in England, placed in regimental command until his mental breakdown at the Battle of Nivelle;
Major Sharpe exercises de facto command between 1813 and 1814, and it is unknown who the nominal Colonel is, or if one is even appointed; the name(s) of the Regimental Colonel(s) between the Battle of Toulouse and the Regiment's appearance during the Waterloo Campaign are unknown;
Joseph Ford (1815), suffers a complete mental breakdown during the final stage of the Battle of Waterloo, and is relieved of command and replaced by Sharpe;
Richard Sharpe (1815), confirmed in command by the Duke of Wellington.
Peter D'Alembord (1815), appointed after Sharpe retires from the army;
The Prince Regent was the nominal Colonel-in-Chief beginning in 1813.

Structure
10 Infantry Companies
Light Company (left flank) – with Riflemen from 95th attached
Grenadier Company (right flank)
8 Regular Line Companies
Attached Regimental Units
10 Pioneers
10 Bandsmen
Regimental Headquarters
Commanding Officer
Colour Party
Regimental Sergeant Major
Quartermaster
Paymaster
Surgeon and Assistant Surgeon
Armourer Sergeant

See also

List of Sharpe series characters

References

Sources 
Adkin, Mark. The Sharpe Companion: A Detailed Historical and Military Guide to Bernard Cornwell’s Bestselling Series of Sharpe Novels. London; New York: Harper Collins, 1998.

External links
Bernard Cornwell's Official Site

Fictional British Army units
Sharpe characters